The Journal of Indian Philosophy (print: ,) is an academic journal on modern and premodern Indian philosophy published by Springer. The editor in chief is Diwakar Acharya.

See also 
 List of philosophy journals

External links 
 

Philosophy journals
Indian philosophy
Springer Science+Business Media academic journals
Bimonthly journals
Publications established in 1972
English-language journals